Mount Brabec is a mountain,  high, surmounting the east wall of Aviator Glacier  north of Mount Monteagle, in the Mountaineer Range of Victoria Land. It was mapped by the United States Geological Survey from surveys and from U.S. Navy air photos, 1960–64, and named by the Advisory Committee on Antarctic Names for Lieutenant Commander Richard C. Brabec, U.S. Navy, a Hercules aircraft commander on U.S. Navy Operation Deepfreeze, 1966.

References 

Mountains of Victoria Land
Mountaineer Range
Borchgrevink Coast